Capeobolus is a genus of flowering plants belonging to the family Cyperaceae.

Its native range is South African Republic.

Species:
 Capeobolus brevicaulis (C.B.Clarke) Browning

References

Cyperaceae
Cyperaceae genera